Kevin Thomas Barry (born 9 January 1961) is an English former footballer who made 18 appearances in the Football League playing as a goalkeeper for Darlington. He was on the books of Nottingham Forest without representing then in the league, and played non-league football for Ashington.

References

1961 births
Living people
Footballers from Newcastle upon Tyne
English footballers
Association football goalkeepers
Nottingham Forest F.C. players
Darlington F.C. players
Ashington A.F.C. players
English Football League players